The Georgia Sustainment and Stability Operations Program (GSSOP) was a security assistance program designed to create an increased capability in the Georgian military to support Operation Iraqi Freedom stability missions. Launched in January 2005, GSSOP was also designed to help solidify the progress made during the Georgia Train and Equip Program (GTEP) of 2002–2004 and continue to assist in the implementation of western standards in the Georgian armed forces.

The first phase of the program (GSSOP-I) lasted about 18 months and cost approximately $60 million. It ended in October 2006 to be succeeded by GSSOP-II, which lasted until June 2007. The training was conducted, primarily at the Krtsanisi National Training Centre near Tbilisi, by the United States Army Special Forces and United States Marine Corps Forces, Europe. The beneficiaries were the 22nd, 23rd, 31st, 32nd and 33rd Light Infantry Battalions, logistic battalions of the 1st, 2nd, and 3rd Infantry Brigades, the reconnaissance companies of the 2nd and 3rd Infantry Brigades, communication companies of the 2nd and 3rd Brigades, and an independent military police company.

On August 31, 2009, the U.S. and Georgia inaugurated the Georgia Deployment Program—International Security Assistance Force (GDP—ISAF) In order to prepare the Georgian units for deployment in Afghanistan as part of the International Security Assistance Force. Originally planned as a two-year engagement, the success of past missions has extended the pairing as the Georgia Deployment Program—Resolute Support Mission (GDP—RSM) into 2020.

References

Military history of Georgia (country)
Operations involving American special forces
United States Marine Corps in the 21st century
Non-combat military operations involving the United States
2005 in Georgia (country)
2006 in Georgia (country)
2007 in Georgia (country)
2008 in Georgia (country)
2009 in Georgia (country)